Csaba Horváth may refer to:
 Csaba Horváth (canoeist) (born 1971), Hungarian sprint canoeist
 Csaba Horváth (chemical engineer) (1930–2004), Hungarian-American chemical engineer
 Csaba Horváth (footballer) (born 1982), Slovak football central defender
 Csaba Horváth (gymnast) (born 1984), Hungarian artistic gymnast
 Csaba Horváth (politician) (born 1969), Hungarian politician
 Csaba Horváth (chess player) (born 1968), Hungarian chess grandmaster